KPTJ 104.5 FM is a radio station licensed to Grape Creek, Texas.  The station began in September 2012 and broadcasts a Latin mix format and is owned by La Unica Broadcasting Co.

References

External links
KPTJ Magic 104.5

PTJ
Radio stations established in 2011
2011 establishments in Texas